Hans Olofsson (18 July 1928 – 13 September 1974) was a Swedish alpine skier. He competed in two events at the 1956 Winter Olympics.

References

External links
 

1928 births
1974 deaths
Swedish male alpine skiers
Olympic alpine skiers of Sweden
Alpine skiers at the 1956 Winter Olympics
People from Storuman Municipality
Sportspeople from Västerbotten County
20th-century Swedish people